The Tiwi Bombers Football Club is an Australian rules football club, currently competing in the Northern Territory Football League.

The club is notable as being the first all-Aboriginal team to play in a major competition.

The team is affiliated with the Essendon Football Club, where two famous Tiwi Island products Michael Long and Dean Rioli played their football in the national Australian Football League (AFL).  Essendon provided jumpers for the team and the team adopted the "Bombers" moniker. The team's initial name was Tiwi Storm.

AFL players Austin Wonaeamirri, Dean Rioli, Willie Rioli and Anthony McDonald-Tipungwuti have played for the club.

Club achievements

2006–07 season

The club won six out of seven "trial" games in its inaugural restricted season, many of the six wins by significant margins displaying a trademark play-on at all costs fast-paced style. Their only defeat was to the eventual NTFL premiers, Southern Districts Football Club, by a small margin.

All of the club's matches were featured nationally on ABC2, a special feature as part of the NTFL's television coverage.  However they defeated the NTFL premiers later in the season in a friendly "mini-Grand Final" rematch.

It was announced early in 2007 that the team would become a permanent part of the NTFL competition in the 07/08 season, although some Tiwi Islands players will be unavailable to play for the Bombers due to contracts to other NTFL clubs.

2007–08 season
In the off season, the club recruited several players from the Southport Sharks in the Queensland State League to boost their height and key position strength.

In the club's maiden season (their first season after the trial season), they started with promise, winning many of their early games and sitting on top of the ladder by mid season.

However injuries and player losses took their toll and the Bombers experienced a form slump later in the season.  They recovered in the last few rounds to keep a finals berth.  Finishing high on the ladder gave them several chances to reach the Grand Final.  However, after losing their qualifying final to St Marys, the Bombers lost the first semi-final to Waratah, extinguishing their aspirations for a flag in their maiden season.  Some cited the lack of a reserves side as a factor in their up and down season.

2017-18 season 
The Bombers bounced back from a wooden spoon in 2016/17 to finish 5th in 2017/18, losing their elimination final to St Mary's. New coach Brenton Toy was instrumental to their success as well as a number of key players including Dion Munkara and Ross Tungatalum.

References

External links

Official website

Sport in Darwin, Northern Territory
Australian rules football clubs in the Northern Territory
Tiwi Islands
2006 establishments in Australia
Australian rules football clubs established in 2006